William O'Neal may refer to:

 William O'Neal (informant) (1949–1990), American FBI informant
 William O'Neal Lockridge (1947–2011), American political activist
 William R. O'Neal (1864–1946) American lawyer and businessman

See also
 William O'Neill (disambiguation)